ArenaBowl XXVIII was the championship game of the 2015 Arena Football League season. It was played between the American Conference Champion Jacksonville Sharks and the National Conference Champion San Jose SaberCats. The game was played at Stockton Arena in Stockton, California.

This was the San Jose SaberCats fourth ArenaBowl championship and fifth overall ArenaBowl appearance. It was the Jacksonville Sharks second ArenaBowl appearance, having won ArenaBowl XXIV in 2011.

The SaberCats finished the 2015 season with a combined 20-1 record, becoming the first team in league history to win twenty combined regular season and postseason games.

Venue
The game was played at Stockton Arena in Stockton, California, as the Ringling Bros. and Barnum & Bailey Circus had booked the SaberCats' usual home arena of SAP Center from August 20 to 30.

Television
This was the second consecutive ArenaBowl televised on ESPN.

Background

Jacksonville Sharks

In , the Sharks began the regular season with a 1–5 record, after having lost the first four games of the season. The Sharks then won their next five games and eventually finished the season with a 10-8 record, earning the third seed in the American Conference. In the conference semifinals, they defeated the Orlando Predators on the road in a 55–33 contest. They then won the conference finals on the road against the Philadelphia Soul by a score of 61–56.

San Jose SaberCats

In , the SaberCats began the regular season with eleven straight wins. They clinched their second consecutive (and tenth overall) division championship when the Portland Thunder lost on June 7. The SaberCats' undefeated streak was snapped when they lost at home to the Los Angeles Kiss, who had a 1–9 record entering the game. The SaberCats won their last six games to finish with a franchise best record of 17–1, with home field advantage for the playoffs. In the conference semifinals, they defeated the Portland Thunder at home by a score of 55–28. They then won the conference finals at home against the Arizona Rattlers in a 70–67 contest.

Box score

Source:

References

028
2015 Arena Football League season
San Jose SaberCats
Jacksonville Sharks
2015 in sports in California
American football competitions in California
2015 in American television
August 2015 sports events in the United States
Sports in Stockton, California